Ptýrov is a municipality and village in Mladá Boleslav District in the Central Bohemian Region of the Czech Republic. It has about 300 inhabitants.

Administrative parts
Villages of Čihátka, Maníkovice and Ptýrovec are administrative parts of Ptýrov.

Gallery

References

Villages in Mladá Boleslav District